Oscar Seín Munguía Zelaya (6 July 1991 – 18 November 2018) was a Honduran footballer who played professionally in Honduras. He was shot in a hotel in his home town of La Ceiba on 18 November 2018, following an argument.

Career statistics

Club

Notes

References

1991 births
2018 deaths
Honduran footballers
Association football goalkeepers
Liga Nacional de Fútbol Profesional de Honduras players
C.D. Victoria players
Arsenal F.C. (Honduras) players
C.D.S. Vida players
Deaths by firearm in Honduras
Honduran murder victims
Male murder victims
People murdered in Honduras